Dan Tullis Jr. (born July 8, 1951) is an American actor. He has played the recurring role of Officer Dan on the sitcom Married... with Children. He also has made an appearance in shows such as 227, The Drew Carey Show, and The District among others. In 1992, he was a regular cast member on the short-lived television series Rachel Gunn, R.N.. In commercials, he has been the television and radio spokesperson for SelectQuote, a life insurance company.

Biography

In 1976, he appeared with his family on the game show Family Feud. Nine years later, he appeared on Tic Tac Dough, winning more than $15,000 in cash and prizes.

In 1987, Dan Tullis Jr. played the role of  Sergeant 1st Class Luther Fry in the film, Extreme Prejudice; co-starring alongside Nick Nolte, Powers Boothe, and Maria Conchita Alonso.

Tullis has also worked in theater. He has played Joe in Show Boat in over 18 productions worldwide, including Long Island, Europe and Australia.

In a California theater production of Little Shop of Horrors, he was cast as the voice of the flesh-eating plant.

Personal life
Tullis has two children: Jillian Tullis and Dan Tullis III. Both are educators.

Filmography

References

External links
  Dan Tullis Jr. on Zoomshare
 

1951 births
Living people
20th-century American male actors
African-American male actors
American male film actors
American male television actors
Male actors from Oxnard, California